Jessica Beth Savitch (February 1, 1947 – October 23, 1983) was an American television journalist who was the weekend anchor of NBC Nightly News and daily newsreader for NBC News during the late 1970s and early 1980s. Savitch was one of the first women to anchor an evening network newscast solo, following in the footsteps of Marlene Sanders of ABC News and Catherine Mackin of NBC News. She also hosted PBS's public affairs program Frontline from its January 1983 debut until her death as a passenger in an automobile accident later that year.

Shortly before her death in October 1983, Savitch gave a broadcast of NBC News Digest in which her delivery was erratic and she appeared to be under the influence of an illicit substance. The incident caused widespread speculation that she was abusing drugs. Savitch died three weeks later by drowning when a car in which she was a passenger was accidentally driven into a canal during a heavy rainstorm. No drugs and very little alcohol were present in her system at the time of her death.

In life, Savitch was renowned for her audience appeal and her skill as an on-camera news reader, although she drew criticism for her relative lack of journalism experience. Prior to joining NBC News, she was a popular local anchorwoman in Philadelphia and before that, while working at a Houston television station, she was the first female news anchor in the South. Posthumously, Savitch became the subject of two biographies and a television film, Almost Golden: The Jessica Savitch Story, as well as television documentaries. The 1996 feature film Up Close and Personal starring Michelle Pfeiffer and Robert Redford was very loosely based on her life. Savitch's experiences as a pioneer anchorwoman also helped inspire Will Ferrell to make the 2004 film Anchorman: The Legend of Ron Burgundy.

Early life and career
Jessica Savitch was born February 1, 1947, in Wilmington, Delaware. She was the eldest daughter of Florence (née Goldberger), a navy nurse, and David Savitch, who ran a clothing store. Her father was of Slavic Jewish heritage and her maternal grandfather was of German and Russian Jewish heritage. Her maternal grandmother was of Italian American heritage and was Catholic. In 1959, after her father died at the age of 33, her family moved from Kennett Square, Pennsylvania, to Margate City, New Jersey. According to her two biographers, Gwenda Blair and Alanna Nash, Savitch was haunted throughout her life by her father's untimely death, and pursued a career partly to compensate for his loss.

While attending Atlantic City High School, Savitch got a job co-hosting a show for teenagers on radio station WOND in Pleasantville. She enjoyed the work and soon became a newsreader and disc jockey for WOND as well. She was the first female disc jockey in the Pleasantville area. Following high school, Savitch attended Ithaca College in Ithaca, New York, as a communications major. According to Savitch, the school's discriminatory attitudes against women prevented her from getting the experience she wanted on the college-owned radio and television stations, so she sought opportunities in nearby Rochester. There, she did on-camera and voiceover commercial work, and while still attending college became a popular top 40 disc jockey known as "Honeybee" at WBBF (now WROC-AM). She graduated from Ithaca College in 1968.

Local news career

In 1969, Savitch was hired as an administrative assistant at WCBS, the CBS Radio flagship news station in New York City, where she also did freelance production work. WCBS refused to hire her as a reporter because she had no professional experience. She used the WCBS-TV facilities to make a television audition tape and sent copies to many television stations around the country, seeking an on-air position.

Despite her lack of broadcast news experience, Savitch was hired by KHOU-TV in Houston as the station's first female reporter. Dick John, the manager who hired her, said he did so because he was impressed with her ambition as well as her copywriting and speaking skills. KHOU had also been ordered to hire a female reporter in order to avoid any legal challenge to its broadcast license based on gender discrimination. When Savitch arrived at KHOU, she was the only female working in the news department other than one secretary and faced a work environment hostile to females, although some male colleagues did help her learn the basics of her job. Because KHOU was non-union, she participated in many aspects of production as well as reporting on camera. A few months after joining KHOU, she auditioned for and won a weekend anchor shift, becoming the first female news anchor in the South and beginning to develop the severe, mannered style of news delivery for which she later became known. Her report on a train derailment and fire received national exposure on the CBS Evening News with Walter Cronkite.

In 1972, Savitch joined KYW-TV, then the NBC affiliate (now CBS O&O) in Philadelphia, as a general assignment reporter and weekend anchor under a five-year contract. Unlike KHOU, KYW was unionized, so Savitch was not permitted to do work other than on-camera newsreading and reporting. At the time KYW hired Savitch, it was under pressure from the Philadelphia chapter of the National Organization for Women (NOW) to place more women in then-non-traditional roles on the local news or else face a possible legal challenge to its broadcast license. When she was initially unable to obtain a weeknight anchor shift, Savitch attempted to break her KYW contract and take a job offered by CBS in New York. KYW refused to release her from her contract but agreed to raise her salary and (partly to satisfy NOW) make her a weeknight anchor. She soon began to anchor noon news broadcasts as well, and eventually became part of a popular team of three anchors with Mort Crim and Vince Leonard on the 11:00pm news. Philadelphia viewers responded enthusiastically to her on-camera presence, which was perceived as "magical" and triggering an "almost emotional bond" with the audience.

At KYW, Savitch won recognition for her multi-part feature stories on unusual (for that time) subjects such as rape and childbirth, the latter of which featured a live television broadcast of a birth during the holiday season. Savitch often personalized her stories by becoming part of the story herself, such as completing the Philadelphia police academy training as part of a series on women in police work, and serving as an undercover decoy for two weeks as part of her series on rape. Her rape series, entitled "Rape: The Ultimate Violation", won a Clarion Award for excellence from Women in Communications, Inc., and helped bring about legislative changes in several states.

As a result of her KYW work, Savitch became a local celebrity in Philadelphia and was sometimes mobbed walking down the street. Male viewers schemed to meet her, and female viewers copied her hairstyle. Despite her local acclaim, Savitch aspired to leave local news and become a network correspondent. In 1976, she came to the attention of NBC executives while reporting from a presidential campaign debate between President Gerald Ford and Democratic nominee Jimmy Carter held at Philadelphia's Walnut Street Theatre. An audio line failed, delaying the debate and leaving Savitch to fill 27 minutes of air time before the audio could be restored. Impressed with her performance, NBC offered her a three-year contract starting in September 1977 as a Washington, D.C. correspondent and anchor. Savitch did her last newscast for KYW in August 1977.

Savitch got along well with some members of the KYW staff, including her regular location shooting crew and her co-anchor Mort Crim. Crim later admitted that he was initially "not nice to her" due to his own male chauvinism, but the two later became good friends. (Crim delivered the eulogy at her memorial service after her death.) However, other staff members found Savitch difficult, especially towards the end of her KYW contract when she was planning to leave for NBC. Shortly before she left KYW, Savitch exploded in an angry tantrum during a commercial break because the pages of her news script had been provided out of order. The crew recorded it without sound, added background music from Aram Khachaturian's "Sabre Dance", and circulated the resulting tape to industry contacts, causing the tape of Savitch's tantrum to arrive at NBC before she began her new job and present her in a negative light to her new colleagues.

National news career

NBC
Savitch joined NBC News in 1977 as a weekend anchor for NBC Nightly News. In order to counter criticism that she had been hired for her looks and promoted ahead of skilled journalists, NBC also assigned her to do reporting work, including a brief stint as U.S. Senate correspondent. Savitch was an extremely competent anchor, but had relatively little reporting experience and struggled as correspondent. By 1979 she was demoted from the Senate assignment due to poor performance. Thereafter, although she was a general assignment reporter and helped to cover the 1980 Republican and Democratic conventions, she was primarily known as an anchor.

Savitch was the network's second woman to anchor a weekend national newscast; Catherine Mackin had previously anchored NBC's Sunday evening newscast beginning in December 1976, before she left for ABC News the following year. Savitch later became the first woman to anchor the weeknight edition of NBC Nightly News, periodically substituting for the regular anchors John Chancellor and David Brinkley. She was also assigned to anchor short NBC News updates (initially called NBC News Update, later called NBC News Capsule and NBC News Digest) that ran approximately one minute and aired between regular prime time programs each evening, drawing a high number of viewers. She began to fill more roles in NBC's news programming, serving as a regular panel member on Meet The Press, contributing to the news magazine programs Prime Time Saturday and Prime Time Sunday, and contributing commentary to the NBC Radio Network. She substituted as anchor on the Today and Tomorrow shows. She was offered the anchor position for an early-morning news program Early Today but turned it down.

As a network anchor, Savitch had a charismatic presence and became very popular with network affiliates and viewers. A 1982 TV Guide poll named her the fourth most trusted news anchor in the country, above many of the most established male anchors of the period. Another 1982 poll named her the "sexiest" female anchor in the country. Affiliates agreed to run the NBC News Update segments largely because she would be presenting them. Her success influenced numerous aspiring female newscasters to model themselves after her look and delivery. In 1980, she was one of the twelve most popular speakers in the United States.

Savitch constantly worked on improving her news reading delivery, using a voice coach and other techniques. NBC executives and colleagues praised her skillful narration of film showing the murders of Congressman Leo Ryan and several others in a mass shooting by members of the Peoples Temple at Jonestown. There had not been time to view the film prior to its broadcast, and Savitch had to improvise her narration while viewing the graphic film for the first time.

PBS anchor
In January 1983, in addition to her work for NBC, Savitch began hosting a new public affairs documentary program on Public Broadcasting Service (PBS), Frontline. She continued as host until her death later that year, at which time Judy Woodruff took over as host.

October 3, 1983 live broadcast incident
Despite Savitch's competence and success as an anchor, by 1983 NBC was beginning to shift its focus to other female anchors, particularly Connie Chung. In June 1983, NBC removed Savitch from her regular Saturday evening anchor slot and replaced her with Chung, who also accepted the Early Today position that Savitch had rejected. From then until her death in October 1983, Savitch's only regular appearances on NBC were on the NBC News Digest segments. Savitch began feeling anxious about her job and showed signs of emotional instability.

On October 3, 1983, during an NBC News Digest segment, Savitch was largely incoherent on the air, slurring her speech, deviating from her script and ad-libbing her report. She performed a later segment the same evening without issues. Savitch's flawed delivery fueled speculation that she was using drugs, specifically cocaine. However, she blamed the problems on a teleprompter malfunction, while her agent said it was due to the effects of pain medication in relation to recent facial reconstructive surgery following a boating accident.

While some of Savitch's colleagues said they had seen evidence of drug use, other friends and associates expressed skepticism that she had a drug problem. NBC correspondent Linda Ellerbee later said that she had asked network management to intervene, telling them, "You have to do something. This woman [Savitch] is in trouble." Ellerbee said that a network vice president responded, "We're afraid to do anything. We're afraid she'll kill herself on our time." When management failed to act, Ellerbee and other correspondents had tried to reach out to Savitch, who died before anything could be done.

Although Savitch biographer Gwenda Blair wrote that Savitch's poor performance on the October 3 segment effectively ended her network career, a People magazine article published after her death said that her NBC contract had actually been renewed (although the renewal was for just one year rather than her previous three-year contracts), that she would have reclaimed a spot as a substitute Sunday anchor for NBC Nightly News in January 1984, and that she was set to appear on another season of Frontline.

Personal life
Savitch was married twice and had no children. Her first marriage in 1980 to Philadelphia advertising executive Melvin "Mel" Korn ended in divorce after eleven months. Korn reportedly divorced Savitch after learning that she had a significant drug problem.

Savitch's second marriage in March 1981 to Dr. Donald Payne, her gynecologist, lasted only a few months. It ended when Payne, who had substance abuse problems of his own and suffered from depression, died of suicide by hanging in their Washington, D.C. townhouse. Savitch, who was in New York at the time, found his body when she returned to the house. Although she was upset by his death, Savitch returned to her work at NBC three weeks later.

Savitch had a long-term intermittent relationship over many years with TV news executive Ron Kershaw, who himself had substance abuse problems and physically abused Savitch during their relationship. In the early 1970s, while she was working for CBS in New York City, Savitch also had a romantic relationship with CBS News journalist Ed Bradley, who was then a WCBS radio reporter. According to Bradley, after the relationship ended they continued to have a "non-romantic, social, and professional relationship" until her death.

According to her biographers Blair and Nash, Savitch was a driven perfectionist who constantly battled insecurities about her appearance and ability, suffered from social anxiety, and tended to isolate herself from network colleagues. Both biographers also write that Savitch had a problem with cocaine that eventually affected her career. Biographers have also asserted that Savitch was bisexual and had romantic relationships with women as well as men. These assertions were disputed by Savitch's family and some of her friends after her death.
 
Savitch's friend, WNBC anchor Sue Simmons, said in a 2013 retrospective article marking the 30th anniversary of Savitch's death, "When the books and the movie came out [after her death], they made her out to be this troubled character. Nobody ever talked about her big heart, her loyalty, her sense of humor, and her fabulousness as a person."

Death
On October 23, 1983, twenty days after her problematic NBC broadcast, Savitch had dinner with Martin Fischbein, vice president of the New York Post, at the Chez Odette restaurant in New Hope, Pennsylvania. Savitch and Fischbein had been dating for a few weeks. After their meal, they began to drive home about 7:15 p.m., with Fischbein behind the wheel and Savitch in the back seat with her dog, Chewy. Fischbein may have missed posted warning signs in a heavy rainfall. He drove out of the wrong exit from the restaurant and up the towpath of the old Pennsylvania Canal's Delaware Division on the Pennsylvania side of the Delaware River. The station wagon veered too far to the left and went over the edge into the shallow water of the canal. After falling approximately fifteen feet and landing upside down in four to five feet of water, the car sank into deep mud that sealed the doors shut. Savitch and Fischbein were trapped inside as water poured in. A local resident found the wreck at about 11:30 that night. Fischbein's body was still strapped behind the wheel, with Savitch and her dog in the back seat.

After autopsies, the Bucks County coroner ruled that both Savitch and Fischbein had died from asphyxiation by drowning. Neither Savitch nor Fischbein had any drugs other than alcohol in their system at the time of death, and they had consumed only small amounts of alcohol—about half a glass of wine each. According to the New Hope police chief, a similar death had occurred at the same spot some years before.

Savitch's family and a group of her friends later sued the New York Post (whose insurance covered the leased car Fischbein was driving), Fischbein's estate, Chez Odette, and the Commonwealth of Pennsylvania for damages in Savitch's death. The suit was settled for $8 million, most of which was paid by the Post. Some of the money was used to establish scholarships for women studying for careers in broadcasting or journalism at Ithaca College and other institutions.

Awards and honors
In 1979, Savitch received an honorary doctorate in humane letters from Ithaca College, her alma mater. She was elected to the college's board of trustees in 1980.

The Broadcast Pioneers of Philadelphia posthumously inducted Savitch into their Hall of Fame in 2006.

In popular culture
Jessica Savitch published her own autobiography, Anchorwoman, in 1982. After her death, two posthumous biographies were written about her. According to The Washington Post, each of her biographers interviewed over 300 people in order to write their respective books. Although both biographies contain similar material, Savitch's family and friends have challenged as untrue portions of the books regarding her reporting skills and controversial aspects of her personal life (see Personal life).

The first biography, Almost Golden: Jessica Savitch and the Selling of Television News (Simon & Schuster, 1988) by Gwenda Blair, told Savitch's story within the broader context of the history of network news. It was later made into a Lifetime Network made-for-TV movie starring Sela Ward, called Almost Golden: The Jessica Savitch Story. When first aired, Almost Golden earned the second-highest rating ever for a  cable television film up to that point. The television film was criticized for omitting or downplaying controversial aspects of Savitch's life and career that were discussed at length in Blair's book.

The second, Golden Girl: The Story of Jessica Savitch (Dutton, 1988) by Alanna Nash, became the basis of the 1996 theatrical film Up Close & Personal starring Michelle Pfeiffer and Robert Redford. Up Close and Personal was originally intended as a biographical film about Savitch. However, the plot of the movie was substantially changed to become a love story quite different from Savitch's life. According to Nash and John Gregory Dunne (who worked on the screenplay and wrote the book Monster: Living Off the Big Screen about the making of the film), this was because the filmmakers, including The Walt Disney Company that was financing the film, considered Savitch's life story too downbeat to be popular at the box office. Many reviews of the movie discuss how the film departed, probably for commercial reasons, from Savitch's actual biography.

Savitch's life was also examined in several television documentaries. The A&E series Biography featured an episode about Savitch, which inspired Will Ferrell to make Anchorman: The Legend of Ron Burgundy (basing the Ron Burgundy character on Savitch's friend Mort Crim). Lifetime also aired a documentary entitled Intimate Portrait: Jessica Savitch that was based on the perspectives of Savitch biographer Alanna Nash.

In episode 2 of season 2 of Only Murders in the Building,  the fictional character Oliver Putnam states that he had an affair with Savitch in the eighties and she left him for Ed Bradley.

References

Further reading
 Blair, Gwenda. Almost Golden: Jessica Savitch and the Selling of Television News. New York: Simon & Schuster, 1988. .
 Nash, Alanna. Golden Girl: The Story of Jessica Savitch. New York: Dutton, 1988. .
 Savitch, Jessica. Anchorwoman. New York: Putnam, 1982. .

External links
 JessicaSavitch.com | A Professional Retrospective
 

1947 births
1983 deaths
20th-century American journalists
20th-century American women
American broadcast news analysts
American writers of Italian descent
American people of Jewish descent
American women television journalists
Atlantic City High School alumni
Deaths by drowning in the United States
Ithaca College alumni
Journalists from Pennsylvania
NBC News people
People from Kennett Square, Pennsylvania
Philadelphia television reporters
Road incident deaths in Pennsylvania
Television anchors from Houston
Television anchors from Philadelphia